The following is the qualification system and qualified athletes for the Taekwondo at the 2019 Pan American Games competitions.

Qualification timeline

Qualification system
A total of 140 taekwondo athletes will qualify to compete. Each nation may enter a maximum of 13 athletes (eight in Kyorugi  and five in Poomsae). The host nation, Peru, automatically qualifies the maximum number of athletes (13) and is entered in each event. There will also nine wild card spots awarded in Kyorugi. The spots were awarded at the qualification tournament held in Santo Domingo in March 2019.

In the Kyorugi discipline, a total of 12 athletes (8 in the +67 kg event for women) will qualify along with one spot in each event for the host nation. In Poomsae, the top five nations in the mixed teams event along with Peru as host nation will qualify a team of five athletes. An extra quota was also awarded in the women's individual event. In poomsae, countries with qualified teams can enter three men and two women, or two men and three women.

Qualification summary

Kyorugi
Countries qualified are listed in random order as the nature of the tournament did not determine medalists.

Men's 58 kg

Men's 68 kg

Men's 80 kg

Men's +80 kg

Women's 49 kg

Women's 57 kg

Women's 67 kg

Women's +67 kg

Poomsae

References

P
Qualification for the 2019 Pan American Games
Taekwondo at the 2019 Pan American Games